John A. Carrig (born January 14, 1952) served as the chief operating officer and president for ConocoPhillips. In 2010, he announced his intention to retire from the company effective February 2011. He had been with ConocoPhillips since 1978 when he was hired as a tax attorney. He had previously been chief financial officer and executive vice president of finance since the merger of Conoco and Phillips Petroleum in 2002.  Before then, he had been CFO at Phillips since 2001. He graduated from Rutgers University in 1974, received a law degree from Temple University in 1977, and an advanced degree in tax law from the New York University School of Law in 1978.

External links
 "ConocoPhillips" on Google Finance
 ConocoPhillips biography

1952 births
Living people
Rutgers University alumni
Temple University Beasley School of Law alumni
New York University School of Law alumni
American chief financial officers
ConocoPhillips people
American chief operating officers
20th-century American businesspeople